In 1912-13 the South Africa national rugby union team toured England, France, Ireland, Scotland, and Wales, playing a series of test matches, as well as games against club, regional, and representative teams. South Africa accomplished their first Grand Slam by winning all four tests against the Home Nations sides, and also won the test match against France. This was the second South African tour of the Northern Hemisphere, after the very successful 1906 tour.

Although not managing to win all the matches on the tour, the Springboks won all five test matches against international opposition. Billy Millar was the tour captain even though he was the last person chosen for the tour and was not the selectors' choice of captain, but they were over-ruled by the South African Rugby Board. Millar did have the advantage of being one of the few players to have toured Britain in the previous test, but was seen by the hosts as a fiery character and was not as popular with the players or fans as the 1906's tour captain, Paul Roos. The other two members of the squad to have played in the 1906 tour were vice-captain Fred 'Uncle' Dobbin and Doug Morkel.

In the touring party were two sets of brothers; Richard, Freddie and John Luyt and Gerhard and Jack Morkel.

Touring party

Manager: Max Honnet
Captain: William Millar
Vice-captain Frederick Dobbin

Full back
J.J. Meintjies (Griqualand West)
Gerhard Morkel (Western Province)

Three-quarters
Otto van der Hoff (Transvaal)
William Krige (Western Province)
Richard Luyt (Western Province)
E.E. McHardy (Orange Free State)
Wally Mills (Western Province)
Jacky Morkel (Western Province)
Johan Stegmann (Transvaal)
Bai Wrentmore (Western Province)

Half-backs
Uncle Dobbin (Griqualand West)
J.H. Immelman (Western Province)
Freddie Luyt (Western Province)
J.D. McCulloch (Griqualand West)

Forwards
J.S. Braine (Griqualand West)
S.N. Cronje (Transvaal)
E.T. Delaney (Griqualand West)
J.A.J. Francis (Transvaal)
Saturday Knight (Transvaal)
Septimus Ledger (Griqualand West)
L.H. Louw (Western Province)
John Luyt (Eastern Province)
William Millar (Western Province)
Douglas Morkel (Transvaal)
Boy Morkel (Western Province)
E.H. Shum (Transvaal)
Gerald Thompson (Western Province)
T.F. van Vuuren (Eastern Province)

Match summary
Complete list of matches played by the Springboks in Europe:

 Test matches

Match details

Monmouthshire

Glamorgan

Llanelli

Newport

Scotland

Ireland

Wales

Neath

Cardiff

Swansea

England

France

Bibliography

External links

 Results overview at rugbyarchive.net

References

South Africa
South Africa
tour
tour
Rugby union tour
Rugby union tour
tour
tour
tour
tour
South Africa national rugby team tours of Europe
Rugby union tours of England
Rugby union tours of Ireland
Rugby union tours of Scotland
Rugby union tours of Wales
Rugby union tours of France